Matthew Owen John Taylor, Baron Taylor of Goss Moor (born 3 January 1963) is a British politician who has been a life peer in the House of Lords since 2010. A member of the Liberal Democrats, he previously served as the Member of Parliament (MP) for Truro and St Austell (Truro, 1987–1997) in Cornwall from 1987 until he stood down at the 2010 general election. He was granted a life peerage and so became a member of the House of Lords on 16 July 2010.

Since 2007, Taylor has worked at a national level with successive governments on reforming national planning policy to support more sustainable forms of development and improved community engagement in placemaking. He is best known for his work in support of rural communities including developing neighbourhood planning policy, as well as creating the Government's "Garden Communities" policies for 21st-century sustainable new communities and neighbourhoods.

Early life
Matthew Taylor is the adopted son of Kenneth Taylor, a television script writer best known for several of the BBC's classic drama series, including a number of Jane Austen adaptions, as well as ITV's The Jewel in the Crown and Channel Four's The Camomile Lawn.

In 2008, he traced his birth mother Margaret Harris, daughter of New Zealand businessman Sir Jack Harris, and learnt that his great-grandfather had been another Liberal MP, Sir Percy Harris who served as Liberal Chief Whip from 1935 to 1945, and Deputy Leader of the Liberal Party from 1940 to 1945.

Education
Taylor was educated first at St Paul's Primary School in Truro and then two independent schools: Treliske Preparatory School (now known as Truro School Prep) on Highertown (A390) in Truro, and University College School in Hampstead, north London, followed by winning a scholarship to Lady Margaret Hall at the University of Oxford where he read Philosophy, Politics and Economics.

Life and career
Politically active from a young age, Taylor campaigned for Liberal Party Deputy Leader and North Cornwall MP John Pardoe in the 1979 United Kingdom general election at the age of sixteen and joined the Cornwall anti-nuclear alliance a year later to campaign against a nuclear power station proposed to be built in the County. He involved himself in environmental and civil liberties campaigns whilst at sixth form. After winning a scholarship, he studied Philosophy, Politics, and Economics at Lady Margaret Hall, Oxford. At the end of his degree, he was elected as President of the Oxford University Student Union for the year 1985–86 on the Liberal/SDP Alliance ticket.

Member of Parliament

In 1986 he was employed by the Parliamentary Liberal Party as their Economic Policy Researcher and assigned to the then Truro MP David Penhaligon who was the Liberal Party's Treasury Spokesman and Deputy Leader. Penhaligon died in a car crash at the end of that year; Taylor was selected to run as the Liberal candidate in the subsequent by-election, which he won in early 1987. Three months later he retained the seat at the 1987 general election. Aged 24, he was the youngest sitting MP and took the title "Baby of the House" from fellow Alliance MP Charles Kennedy, holding the title for 10 years until 1997. His celebrity status gave him early access to political media and television programmes including the BBC's Question Time, while being an MP in a small party brought quick promotion to the front bench as local government spokesman.

After the break up of the SDP Liberal Alliance in 1987-8 and the new 'Social and Liberal Democratic Party' coming behind the Greens in the 1989 European Elections, Taylor was asked by the new Leader Paddy Ashdown to take on the leadership of Party Communications and relaunch and rebrand the Party. In the role 'Chairman of Communications'(1989–92)he put together and led a small group of outside experts including Jeremy Bullmore (then deputy to Martin Sorrell at WPP, and former Creative Head at J Walter Thompson), Rodney Fitch (founder of design agency RS Fitch), and Derek Martin (founder director of Martin Hamblin Research), and together they created the Liberal Democrats brand and branding, including the new name and the Bird of Liberty logo. Conservative Prime Minister Margaret Thatcher famously mocked the new logo as a 'Dead Parrot' (referencing a famous Monty Python sketch) in her 1990 Conference speech – only to see her party humiliated the following day by the Liberal Democrats winning the Eastbourne by-election, a previously safe Conservative seat. Taylor's role was expanded to a new role of 'Chairman of Campaigns and Communications' (1992–94), responsible for key campaign themes and policies, Party Broadcasts, and oversight of by-elections, national election campaigns and campaign themes, during which time the Party continued to win by-elections such as Newbury and Christchurch and achieved a record tally of General Election seats in 1997. 
	
From 1990–1994 Taylor was also the Party's Education Spokesman, authoring the Liberal Democrat's most well known policy position at that time, to commit to increase basic rate Income Tax for Education. He then moved to be Environment spokesman 1994-7, committing the party to a switch to environment taxes (specifically a carbon tax) mitigated by a cut in VAT, under the slogan 'we won't tax more, but we will tax differently'. In this role he won the Green Magazine award for 'Most effective environmental MP' in 1996.

Taylor also had a successful track record in backing leaders of his party, including Paddy Ashdown and Charles Kennedy, whose successful leadership campaign Taylor helped shape as Kennedy's Campaign Chairman in 1999 after Ashdown stepped down. His reward was to be made the Liberal Democrat Treasury spokesperson (1999–2003) by Kennedy, in which role he attacked Labour over its decision in the March 2000 budget to shed a penny from the basic rate of income tax, and announced the policy of raising the upper rate to 50% for people earning over £100,000. He was asked to lead the preparation of the 2001 General Election manifesto, which he co-authored with Professor Richard Grayson who was then Charles Kennedy's Head of Office..

After being replaced in the Treasury role by Vince Cable MP in 2003, Taylor became Party Chairman. In this role he returned formally to his leading role in Party Campaigns and Communications, with responsibility for oversight of both the Parliamentary Party's Communications team and its Policy team, and was again tasked with writing the 2005 General Election manifesto. He was one of a small number of people in the immediate leadership team aware of and attempting to get Kennedy to address his increasing problems with alcohol, eventually giving Kennedy an ultimatum in the approach to the 2005 General Election that if he failed to address the issue he would have to stand down as leader.

After the 2005 election he re-stood for chair of the Liberal Democrats (a role elected by Liberal Democrat MPs) but lost to Paul Holmes by 36 votes to 23. According to a biography of Charles Kennedy, Holmes was seen as a "shop steward" of the backbenches, whereas Taylor was within the leader's inner circle.

Departure from the House of Commons

After the 2005 General Election where Kennedy's alcohol issues had become an increasing impediment, Taylor stepped back from a leading role in the Party, refusing a shadow cabinet position. He stood for the Deputy Leadership in 2006 and was defeated by Vince Cable by one vote. Cable had argued that Taylor was a potential leadership candidate and the Deputy position should not be occupied by someone with Leadership ambitions. In fact Cable went on to be leader, whereas Taylor had decided already he would not stand again. After the birth of his son Arthur, he announced in 2007 that he would not be seeking re-election to parliament and did not stand in the 2010 General Election. The Truro and St Austell constituency he represented was then abolished after a boundary review.

After the 2010 General Election the Liberal Democrats secured a significant increase in Peerages reflecting their General Election success which has propelled them into coalition government.  Taylor received one of these life peerage in the 2010 Dissolution Honours and his title was gazetted as Baron Taylor of Goss Moor, of Truro in the County of Cornwall on 16 July 2010. Taylor continues to sit as a Liberal Democrat peer in the House of Lords. but takes no Party roles, working instead advising successive Governments on planning policy reforms

In 2007, after he had announced he would not be standing again for re-election as an MP, he was approached by the new Prime Minister, Gordon Brown (who he had shadowed as Lib Dem Spokesman when Brown was Chancellor of the Exchequer) to conduct a Rural Economy Review. Taylor negotiated to extend the review to include housing, and to focus it on planning policy reforms. He published this Government Review as "Living Working Countryside' in summer 2008.  The Labour Government endorsed all but one recommendation (to restrict conversion of full time homes to holiday homes).The 2008 economic crisis delayed implementation of some of the changes, but despite being initiated by a Labour Government and carried out by a Liberal Democrat MP, the Review caught the eye of Conservative policy makers, and laid the foundations for the subsequent Government's Neighbourhood Planning reforms and the new National Planning Policy Framework, on both of which Taylor was asked to advise.

In 2011–12 he was then asked by Planning Minister Greg Barker and his successor Nick Boles to lead the Government's review of all the planning practice guidance sitting behind the NPPF In this role Taylor created the new National Planning Practice Guidance suite, replacing hundreds of documents amounting to 6000 pages, some as much as 30 years old, with a new single online resource.

In 2015 he developed his ‘Garden Village’ proposal, published by Policy Exchange, for enabling local authorities to support new sustainable mixed use communities to meet housing need, rather than encircle towns and villages with more and more poor quality housing estates. Taylor argued this built on the thinking of Ebenezer Howard's Garden Cities, and the post war New Towns, but in a 21st century context of sustainable development. The proposal was adopted as national policy by the new Conservative Government at the March 2016 Budget.

Taylor continues to informally advise Government, Homes England and local authorities on how best to deliver sustainable mixed use developments, and runs his own consultancy business (Taylor & Garner Ltd) advising the public and private sector on a significant number of major new ‘garden community’ projects, focusing on larger scale new settlements, sustainable urban extensions and urban renewal projects.

Alongside his planning work, Taylor became chair of the National Housing Federation (representing the UK's 1200 charitable Housing Associations) from 2010–2016. He was also elected President of the National Association of Local Councils 2016–18 (representing England's Town and Parish Councils). Taylor has been made an Honorary Member of the RTPI, Visiting Professor of Planning at Plymouth University, and Senior Visiting Fellow at Cambridge University’s School of Planning

Outside Housing and Planning, Taylor was a Non-Executive Director of South West Water 2010–2020 and now chairs their 'WaterShare+' customer panel. He is also Chairman of Kensa Group, the UK's leading manufacturer and installer of Ground Sourced Heating systems, originally focused on social housing retrofit to deliver lowest carbon lowest cost to run heat for low income tenants, but now also delivering to new build at scale using networked shared ground arrays to offer zero-carbon ready heating.

Personal life
Taylor married Vicky Garner, a former director of pressure group Surfers Against Sewage, in 2007. The couple have three sons. They divorced in 2017, sharing the care of their children equally. Vicky Garner remarried in 2018.

In November 2007, Taylor and his wife established their own company, Taylor & Garner Ltd, in Roche, Cornwall, to provide consultancy services. Vicky Garner resigned from the business in 2017.

References

External links
  Matthew Taylor MP Official site
 Matthew Taylor MP Profile at the site of Liberal Democrats
 ePolitix.com – Matthew Taylor 
 
 Guardian Politics – Ask Aristotle: Matthew Taylor MP
 TheyWorkForYou.com – Matthew Taylor MP
 The Public Whip – Matthew Taylor Voting record
 BBC News – Matthew Taylor  profile 16 March 2006

News items
 February 2007 Guardian article
 Son born November 2006

1963 births
Living people
Liberal Democrats (UK) life peers
Life peers created by Elizabeth II
Liberal Democrats (UK) MPs for English constituencies
Members of the Parliament of the United Kingdom for Truro
Alumni of Lady Margaret Hall, Oxford
UK MPs 1983–1987
UK MPs 1987–1992
UK MPs 1992–1997
UK MPs 1997–2001
UK MPs 2001–2005
UK MPs 2005–2010
People educated at University College School
British adoptees